Matthew Lewis (born March 8, 1930) is an American photojournalist who won a Pulitzer Prize for his 1975 work with The Washington Post.

Biography & Career

Lewis was born in McDonald, Pennsylvania and later moved to Washington, DC in 1947. He attended college at Howard University in 1947 for a year and then continued at the University of Pittsburgh the next year before he dropped out. From 1949–1952, Lewis served as a hospital corpsman for the United States Navy. Lewis received his first job at Morgan State University where he worked in the audio visual department. Lewis freelanced for the Baltimore Afro-American before getting a job with the Washington Post in 1965 as a staff photographer. He was eventually promoted to assistant managing editor of photography. where he covered Civil Rights marches, Super Bowls, and John F. Kennedy's funeral. He was the first African-American photographer to work for the Washington Post.  Lewis retired in 1990 and moved  with his wife Jeannine to Thomasville, North Carolina. He began working at the Thomasville Times in 1990 to keep himself busy.

Awards
In 1975, Lewis was awarded the Pulitzer Prize for Feature Photography "for his photographs in color and black and white." These photos portrayed various aspects of "the Washington lifestyle."  Lewis won first place in the White House News Photographers Association competitions in 1968 and 1971 In 2010, the International Civil Rights Center & Museum honored Lewis during a special tribute and public reception.

References

Further reading
 Coar, Valencia Hollins. A Century of black photographers, 1840-1960 [exhibition catalog]. Providence, RI: Museum of Art, Rhode Island School of Design, 1983.

External links
"Documenting the Riots", The Washington Post, April 3, 2008
"Matthew Lewis", Washington Photo Store
2011 PBS Interview with Matthew Lewis

See also
 

 

1930 births
American photographers
Morgan State University alumni
Living people
Pulitzer Prize for Feature Photography winners
Date of birth missing (living people)
People from McDonald, Pennsylvania